S. domesticus may refer to:
 Scotophaeus domesticus, Tikader, 1962, a spider species in the genus Scotophaeus found in India and China
 Sus domesticus, the domestic pig, a mammal species

See also
 Domesticus (disambiguation)